The 1996 European Open was a professional ranking snooker tournament that took place between 25 February to 3 March 1996 at the Mediterranean Conference Centre in Valletta, Malta.

John Parrott won the tournament, defeating Peter Ebdon 9–7 in the final. The defending champion Stephen Hendry was eliminated by Joe Swail in the last 16 round.

Wildcard round

Main draw

References

European Masters (snooker)
European Open
European Open (snooker)
European Open
European Open
Snooker in Malta